Moctesuma Esparza (born March 12, 1949) is an American producer, entertainment executive, entrepreneur and community activist. Moctesuma Esparza is well known for his contributions to the movie industry and commitment to creating opportunities for Latinos everywhere. He is the CEO of Maya Cinemas, a theater chain servicing to the United States Latino audience. He is also a partner with Carolyn Caldera in the company Esparza/Caldera Entertainment.  Moctesuma founded Maya Entertainment in 2007, a vertically integrated media content company providing full service motion picture distribution and production.

He is "an outspoken promoter of Latino films" and many of his films focus on Chicano themes. He has produced over twenty films, several of them for television, and has won over 200 awards.

A participant in the 1960s-era movement for the civil rights and equality of Mexican Americans, Esparza remains committed to public service, donating his time to educational, cultural, and professional organizations, especially those that aim to educate Latinos in the business of media production.

Childhood and education

Esparza was born and raised in East Los Angeles, California. His father, a refugee of the Mexican Revolution, migrated to the United States in 1918. His father's awareness of the motivations behind the Revolution imbued him with a strong sense of social justice. As a child, he viewed Spanish language films in the many Los Angeles theaters that offered such fare. Moctesuma was a theatre major in high school. He acted, played the saxophone, and loved movies.

He attended the School of Theater, Film and Television at the University of California, Los Angeles, where he received his B.A. in 1971 and M.F.A. in the same field in 1973. During his sophomore year at UCLA, Moctesuma created an ethno-communications program at the film school. He wrote a proposal, made the curriculum, and successfully created (and was a student in) the first multicultural film program in the United States.

During the 1960s, he participated in the Chicano Movement, advocating for the civil rights of Mexican Americans. He was one of the organizers of the 1968 Chicano Blowouts, a series of youth-led protests inspired by educator Sal Castro in which Mexican-Americans demanded equal educational opportunities. His role in the walkouts as "liaison to the press," which led to his interest in the media. The movement is memorialized in his 2006 HBO film Walkout.

Career

Early years
Esparza's earliest work in film was in service to the Chicano Movement. He filmed a speech given by Reies Lopez Tijerina at UCLA, as well as the 1970 Chicano Moratorium against the Vietnam War. The Moratorium footage became his first documentary, Requiem 29. He helped organize Chicano student conferences and the Media Urban Crisis Committee, which analyzed the effects of media on minority communities and recommended that members of those communities attend film school.

Producer
After graduating from UCLA, he worked for the children's television program Sesame Street, developing bilingual segments. Shortly thereafter, he produced the television pilot and the first season of the PBS program Villa Alegre, which won multiple awards. His first commercial production, Drunk Drivers Get Carried Away, received a Clio Award. He was a producer and writer for the documentary unit of NBC in Los Angeles.

Following the success of Villa Alegre, Esparza became an independent producer of documentaries. He also filmed a production of the Chicano comedy troupe Culture Clash, A Bowl of Beings. His big break into Hollywood cinema was the feature film The Milagro Beanfield War as a partner at Esparza-Katz Productions, where some of his other production credits include Selena and Introducing Dorothy Dandridge.

Maya Cinemas
In 2005, Esparza opened the first multiplex in the Maya Cinemas chain, a 14-screen theater in Salinas, California. Since then, he has opened 16 other multiplexes in California, with 26 more scheduled to open in Texas. Maya Cinemas primarily shows first-run Hollywood films, sometimes with subtitles in Spanish, but also screens foreign and independent films. The concessions offer traditional snacks such as popcorn as well as "Latino favorites like tacos and churros." They all feature Mayan motifs, hearkening back to the Los Angeles theaters of Esparza's youth.

In 2007, Esparza resigned from the board of trustees of the California State University system. After planning to open a Maya Cinemas at the Campus Pointe Project at California State University, Fresno, a neighboring landholder who also planned to open a cinema presented a legal challenge, charging that Esparza had a conflict of interest in developing the project while sitting on the board of trustees. Despite the University's finding that there was no conflict of interest, Esparza resigned out of "respect for the intent of the government code to avoid even the appearance of conflict of interest."

Maya Cinemas opened up a movie theater facility in Pittsburg, California that replaced the Brendan Theaters location which closed in April 2012. The grand opening was held on August 3, 2012, but the ribbon cutting was held the previous evening. 3 Years later, they opened up a movie theater facility in Fresno, California by the college campus. The new location has seats where patrons can sit down while they wait for their movie to play.

Maya Entertainment
In 2007, Moctesuma founded Maya Entertainment, a vertically integrated media content company providing full service motion picture distribution and production. Maya acquires, produces, and distributes multicultural and Latino-themed product for all distribution platforms throughout the world and is dedicated to the growing US Latino market. This year, Maya expanded significantly releasing more than twenty films.

Board member
He has served on: the Corporate Board of Directors of the Motion Picture Television Fund and the Board of Directors of the Museum of Latin American Art. Esparza has been a Trustee of the California State University System and a commissioner to the Los Angeles City Retirement System.

He serves on the National Hispanic Cultural Center Advisory Board, the Latino Coalition Against Aids Advisory Board, the National Hispanic Media Coalition Advisory Board, the Toigo Advisory Board, the Minority Media Telecommunications Council Board of Advisors, the American Film Institute Board of Trustees, the UCLA School of Theater,  the Film and Television Dean's Executive Board, the Claremont University Consortium Board of Overseers, the New America Alliance, the Board of the Marathon Club (and was a former Chair). He is co-chairman of the Board of the Latino Theater Company in Los Angeles.

Awards
Moctezuma has won over 200 honors and awards, including an Emmy Award, a Clio Award, an ALMA Award, and a CINE Golden Eagle Award. Additionally, he has been nominated for an Academy Award and a Golden Globe. He received the 1994 Professional Achievement Award from the UCLA Alumni Association. In 2008, Moctesuma was selected as one of the 50 "Most Powerful and Influential Latinos" by The Imagen Foundation.

Filmography
Taco Shop (2012) (executive producer) (filming) 
Mosquita y Mari (2011) (executive producer) (filming) 
Without Men (2011) (executive producer)
Across the Line: The Exodus of Charlie Wright (2010) (executive producer)
Harlem Hostel (2010) (executive producer)
One Hot Summer (2009) (made for television) (executive producer)
Moe (2008) (executive producer)
The Startup (2007) (executive producer)
Walkout (2006) (HBO)
Gods and Generals (2003) (executive)
Price of Glory (2000)
Introducing Dorothy Dandridge (1999) (executive, made for television)
Selma, Lord, Selma (1999) (executive, made for television)
Butter (1998) (executive, released on video as Never 2 Big)
Rough Riders (1997) (TV) (executive)
The Disappearance of Garcia Lorca (1997)
Selena (1997)
The Avenging Angel (1995) (made for television)
The Cisco Kid (1994) (TV) (executive)
Gettysburg (1993)
The Ambulance (1990)
The Milagro Beanfield War (1988)
The Telephone (1988)
Radioactive Dreams (1985)
The Ballad of Gregorio Cortez (1982) (made for television) 
Agueda Martinez: Our People, Our Country (1977) (producer)      
Only Once in a Lifetime (1979)
Villa Alegre (1973) (producer- season 1) 
Selena: The Series (2020) (producer)

Public service
Founding member, César Chávez Foundation (2002— )
Member, Board of Commissioners, Los Angeles Homeless Services Authority (2009— )
Corporate Board of Directors, Motion Picture Television Fund
Advisory Board, National Hispanic Media Coalition
Board of Directors, Museum of Latin American Art
Member, Board of Trustees, California State University (2004–07)
Chair of the Board, New America Alliance (2000–03)
Co-Founder/Board member, National Association of Latino Producers
Founder and Board of Directors member, Los Angeles Academy of Arts and Enterprise Charter School
Board of Advisors, Minority Media Telecommunications Council

Quotes

References

External links

1949 births
American film producers
American television producers
Living people
Activists for Hispanic and Latino American civil rights
American film directors of Mexican descent
UCLA Film School alumni
American chief executives